La Pachanga (The Party) is a 1981 Mexican comedy film, directed by José Estrada. The film received three Ariel Awards in 1983: Best Director, Best Editing and Best Art Direction.

Plot
During a weekend in Mexico City, the inhabitants of an old apartment building held two separate ceremonies: a quinceañera and a wake. Neighbors are mixed between the two parties while love, sex, comedy and tragedy are combined.

Main cast
Julissa as Adela
Claudia Islas as Carmen
Gregorio Casal as Alejo
Sergio Jiménez as Don Moshe Mostkoff
Alejandro Ciangherotti as Vicente
Patricia Rivera as Elodia
Elsa Cárdenas as Laura
Noé Murayama as Rey
Carmelita González as Doña Eugenia

Awards

Ariel Awards
The Ariel Awards are awarded annually by the Mexican Academy of Film Arts and Sciences in Mexico. La Pachanga received three awards out of eight nominations.

|-
|rowspan="8" scope="row"| 1983
|scope="row"| José Estrada
|scope="row"| Best Director
| 
|-
|scope="row"| Noé Murayama
|rowspan="2" scope="row"| Best Actor
| 
|-
|scope="row"| Sergio Jiménez
| 
|-
|scope="row"| María Rojo
|rowspan="1" scope="row"| Best Actress
| 
|-
|scope="row"| Alejandro Ciangherotti
|rowspan="1" scope="row"| Best Supporting Actor
| 
|-
|scope="row"| José Morales Montáñez
|rowspan="1" scope="row"| Best Art Direction
| 
|-
|scope="row"| Rosalío Solano
|rowspan="1" scope="row"| Best Cinematography
| 
|-
|scope="row"| Rafael Ceballos
|rowspan="1" scope="row"| Best Editing
| 
|-

External links

References

1981 films
1981 comedy films
Mexican comedy films
1980s Spanish-language films
1980s Mexican films